The Blythe Mesa Solar Power Project, also known as the Blythe Solar Energy Center, is a 485 megawatt (MWAC) photovoltaic power plant near the city of Blythe in  Riverside County, California.   It occupies about 2,000 acres of public land managed by the Bureau of Land Management in the Mojave Desert.  The construction uses CdTe thin film panels from the U.S. firm First Solar,  and the majority of the output is being sold to Kaiser Permanente and Southern California Edison under 20-year power purchase agreements.

The project is located adjacent to the 250 MW McCoy Solar Energy Project, together forming a larger 485 MW complex.

Project Details 

The current project configuration follows extensive efforts, which are detailed in the next section, to develop the site for other renewable energy facilities.  These efforts were initiated in earnest around 2010, and concluded in June 2012 when NextEra Energy Resources acquired the resulting assets.

In 2013, NextEra Energy submitted a proposal to modify the project size to three 125 MW sections, and one 110 MW section, for a total of 485 MW on 4,070 acres. Approval by the state was granted in January 2014.  On August 24, 2015, the Interior Department publicly announced that the Bureau of Land Management (BLM) had also approved the modification.

NextEra began land clearing for the first production unit at the start of 2015.  Kaiser Permanente announced in February 2015 that it would buy 110MW of electricity from the project.  Construction activities ramped up quickly soon after in March 2015.  In November 2015,  the California PUC announced its approval of a power purchase agreement between NextEra and Southern California Edison for 125MW of electricity from the second unit.

The first two 110MW and 125MW units were commissioned in April and October 2016, respectively.   Construction of additional units is pending identification of more buyers.   In September 2017 the Modesto Irrigation District agreed to purchase 2.5 million megawatt-hours of electricity over 20 years.

Prior Development History 

The project was originally developed by Solar Trust of America. Also Chevron Energy Solutions planned to participate in the project. Solar Trust was formed as a majority-owned (70%) subsidiary of Solar Millennium. California will need from 15,000 to 20,000 MW of renewable energy to meet the 33% renewable electricity generation requirement by 2020.

The California Energy Commission unanimously approved the project on September 15, 2010. The Bureau of Land Management cleared the project to go ahead on October 25, 2010.

In April 2011, the U.S. Department of Energy offered a $2.1 billion conditional loan guarantee to Solar Trust, to reduce the interest on the $2.8 billion cost of building the first half of the project.  The offer was rejected by Solar Trust.

In August 2011, Solar Trust of America announced that the first half of the project would use photovoltaic panels instead of solar thermal power.  Another trust partner, Solarhybrid (a German solar energy developer), was in talks with First Solar for supply of photovoltaic modules.

In 2012, Solar Millennium tried to sell its stake in Solar Trust to Solarhybrid; however, this deal collapsed and Solar Trust filed for bankruptcy protection. NextEra Energy Inc. was the top bidder for the project, according to an attorney representing creditors, acquiring the project in June 2012.

Electricity Production

See also

McCoy Solar Energy Project
Blythe Photovoltaic Power Plant
Solar power in California
Solar power in the United States

References

External links 
 

 Blythe Solar Power Project (BSPP) (CACA 48811), U.S. Bureau of Land Management

Solar power in the Mojave Desert
Photovoltaic power stations in the United States
Buildings and structures in Riverside County, California
Solar power stations in California
Energy infrastructure completed in 2016
2016 establishments in California
NextEra Energy